Kevin Alexander Boon (a.k.a. Kevin A. Boon, Kevin Boon, Doc Boon) is a Pushcart-nominated author, an award-winning filmmaker, and a Professor of English and Media Studies at Penn State Mont Alto.

Selected works

Book-length scholarly works

Creative works

Fiction

Filmography

Film awards

External links 
 Kevin Alexander Boon – Website
 Third Child Productions – Website
 Kevin Alexander Boon at Penn State Mont Alto

Notes
 

1956 births
Living people